Verkhnearshinsky (Ürge Arşa) is a rural locality (a selo) in Nikolayevsky Selsoviet, Beloretsky District, Bashkortostan, Russia. The population was 119 as of 2010. There are 17 streets.

Geography 
Verkhnearshinsky is located 74 km north of Beloretsk (the district's administrative centre) by road. Nikolayevka is the nearest rural locality.

References 

Rural localities in Beloretsky District